Carol Arata (August 4, 1935 – November 1, 2020), known professionally as Carol Arthur, was an American actress, mainly recognizable in supporting roles in films directed by Mel Brooks.

Early life
Arthur was born in Hackensack, New Jersey and raised in nearby East Rutherford, the daughter of Mildred (née Foehl) and Peter Arata, a police officer. She graduated from East Rutherford High School, where she edited the school paper and performed on stage.

Career
Arthur appeared in minor roles in four films directed by Mel Brooks and in other works with her husband, Dom DeLuise, including Brooks' Blazing Saddles (1974) as the outspoken town school teacher Harriett Johnson ("You are the leading asshole in the state!"). 

One of her more notable credits was as the daughter of George Burns' character in The Sunshine Boys (1975). She also guest-starred on many television shows from the mid-1970s to the mid-2000s, including The Dom DeLuise Show, Emergency!, Sanford and Son, Rhoda, Alice, Steven Spielberg's Amazing Stories, St. Elsewhere, and 7th Heaven.

During the late-1970s and early-1980s, Arthur appeared as "Safety Sadie", the spokeswoman for the United States Consumer Product Safety Commission (CPSC) in several television and radio public service announcements.

Arthur also appeared in various stage productions, including the role of Mrs. Paroo in the short-lived 1980 Broadway revival of The Music Man starring Dick Van Dyke.

Personal life
Arthur met her future husband, DeLuise, in 1964 while working in various stage theaters in Provincetown, Massachusetts. The couple married in 1965, together they had three sons, all of whom have become actors: Peter, Michael, and David DeLuise.

Death
Arthur died on November 1, 2020, at age 85, at the Motion Picture & Television Country House and Hospital in Los Angeles. She had been diagnosed with Alzheimer's disease eleven years earlier. She was survived by her three sons and several grandchildren.

Filmography

Film

Television

Theatre

References

External links 

 
 

1935 births
2020 deaths
20th-century American actresses
21st-century American actresses
Actresses from New Jersey
People from East Rutherford, New Jersey
People from Hackensack, New Jersey
American film actresses
American television actresses
Deaths from Alzheimer's disease
DeLuise family
East Rutherford High School alumni
Deaths from dementia in California